In mathematics, an acyclic space is a nonempty topological space X in which cycles are always boundaries, in the sense of homology theory. This implies that integral homology groups in all dimensions of X are isomorphic to the corresponding homology groups of a point.

In other words, using the idea of reduced homology,

It is common to consider such a space as a nonempty space without "holes"; for example, a circle or a sphere is not acyclic but a disc
or a ball is acyclic. This condition however is weaker than asking that every closed loop in the space would bound a disc in the space, all we ask is that any closed loop—and higher dimensional analogue thereof—would bound something like a "two-dimensional surface." 
The condition of acyclicity on a space X implies, for example, for nice spaces—say, simplicial complexes—that any continuous map of X to the circle or to the higher spheres is null-homotopic.

If a space X is contractible, then it is also acyclic, by the homotopy invariance of homology.  The converse is not true, in general.  Nevertheless, if X is an acyclic CW complex, and if the fundamental group of X is trivial, then X is a contractible space, as follows from the Whitehead theorem and the Hurewicz theorem.

Examples

Acyclic spaces occur in topology, where they can be used to construct other, more interesting topological spaces.

For instance, if one removes a single point from a manifold M which is a homology sphere, one gets such a space. The homotopy groups of an acyclic space X do not vanish in general, because the fundamental group  need not be trivial. For example, the punctured Poincaré homology sphere is an acyclic, 3-dimensional manifold which is not contractible.

This gives a repertoire of examples, since the first homology group is the abelianization of the fundamental group. With every perfect group G one can associate a (canonical, terminal) acyclic space, whose fundamental group is a central extension of the given group G.

The homotopy groups of these associated acyclic spaces are closely related to Quillen's plus construction on the classifying space BG.

Acyclic groups
An acyclic group is a group G whose classifying space BG is acyclic; in other words, all its (reduced) homology groups vanish, i.e., for all . Every acyclic group is thus a perfect group, meaning its first homology group vanishes: , and in fact, a superperfect group, meaning the first two homology groups vanish: . The converse is not true: the binary icosahedral group is superperfect (hence perfect) but not acyclic.

See also
 Aspherical space

References

External links
 

Algebraic topology
Homology theory
Homotopy theory